Desmond Harrison (born October 8, 1993) is an American football offensive tackle who is a free agent. He played college football at Texas and later West Georgia.

College career
Following his time at Contra Costa College, Harrison was seen as a top recruit after being named to the All-American Community College First-team.  Harrison joined the Texas Longhorns for his junior year, but was deemed academically ineligible to play before the season started.  This was because Harrison had taken an online course at Brigham Young University during his time at Contra Costa, and BYU's school policy stated that student-athletes from other universities could not receive credit from online courses.  The NCAA later cleared Harrison to play. Harrison later missed the entire 2014 season after he was suspended a total of 3 times.  He was able to use this as a redshirt year, but he was not able to rejoin the program for the 2015 season.  After leaving Texas, he spent two years away from football, and later joined the West Georgia Wolves for the 2017 season.  Following his senior season at West Georgia, Harrison was invited to the 2018 Senior Bowl.

Professional career

At the 2018 NFL combine, Harrison garnered attention after running the 40-yard dash in 4.9 seconds, the 2nd fastest of any offensive line prospect at the combine. He also recorded an unofficial time of 4.75 seconds.  Despite a strong combine, he was not selected in the 2018 NFL Draft.

Cleveland Browns
Harrison signed with the Cleveland Browns as an undrafted free agent on May 4, 2018. After an impressive rookie training camp, the Browns named Harrison their starting left tackle on September 7, 2018. Following the Browns' firing of head coach Hue Jackson on October 29, 2018, Harrison was benched by interim head coach Gregg Williams in favor of Greg Robinson.

On June 5, 2019, Harrison was waived by the Browns after a missed flight caused him to miss the first day of Cleveland's mandatory mini-camp, deemed to be "one too many missteps" for Harrison.

Arizona Cardinals
On June 6, 2019, Harrison was claimed by the Arizona Cardinals, the day after he was waived by the Browns. A month later on July 17, the Cardinals released Harrison following news of assault allegations and a felony arrest warrant in North Carolina.

Personal
In July 2019, a warrant was issued for the arrest of Harrison, who was charged with assault on a person by strangulation and assault on a woman by a man. He turned himself in to police in Greensboro, North Carolina on July 19, 2019, and was held at the Guilford County Jail. He was suspended for the first six games of the 2021 NFL season by the league on March 10, 2021.

References

External links
West Georgia Wolves bio
Texas Longhorns bio
twitter
Cleveland Browns bio

1993 births
Living people
Players of American football from Houston
American football offensive tackles
Contra Costa Comets football players
West Georgia Wolves football players
Texas Longhorns football players
Oak Ridge Military Academy alumni
Cleveland Browns players
Arizona Cardinals players